In enzymology, a dolichol O-acyltransferase is an enzyme that catalyzes the chemical reaction

palmitoyl-CoA + dolichol  CoA + dolichyl palmitate

Thus, the two substrates of this enzyme are palmitoyl-CoA and dolichol, whereas its two products are CoA and dolichyl palmitate.

This enzyme belongs to the family of transferases, specifically those acyltransferases transferring groups other than aminoacyl groups.  The systematic name of this enzyme class is palmitoyl-CoA:dolichol O-palmitoyltransferase. This enzyme is also called acyl-CoA:dolichol acyltransferase.

References

 

EC 2.3.1
Enzymes of unknown structure